George B. Wells was an American football coach.

Coaching career
Wells attended Alma College in Alma, Michigan, and as a student, conducted the preliminary coaching of the Alma football team after the previous coach, Professor John H. Rice, left the school. During the season, the coaching duties were carried out by Dr. George Sweetland of Grand Rapids, Michigan, and the team compiled a record of 1–2.

Head coaching record

References

Year of birth missing
Year of death missing
Alma Scots football coaches
Alma College alumni